The Oakland District is a historic district in the Oakland community area of Chicago, Illinois, United States.  The district was built between 1872 and 1905 by Cicero Hine and other various architects. It was designated a Chicago Landmark on March 25, 1992.

References

Historic districts in Chicago
South Side, Chicago
Chicago Landmarks